Metin Kurt (15 March 1948 – 26 August 2012) was a Turkish football player, who played as a winger, and manager. He was nicknamed Çizgi Metin (English, "Sideline Metin") because he drew opponents towards him when he played. Kurt spent most of his career in the Turkish Süper Lig, and is best known for his stint with Galatasaray where he won three consecutive Süper Lig titles.

Outside football
Kurt was a Communist and revolutionary sports worker, who was a TKP member and founded various unionist organizations for football. He briefly coached after his footballing career, and was sports writer for a magazine he released called "Sportmen".

Personal life
Metin is the brother of the footballer İsmail Kurt.

Death
Kurt died of a heart attack on 26 August 2012 in Istanbul, Turkey.

Honours
Galatasaray
Süper Lig (4): 1970–71, 1971–72, 1972–73
TSYD Cup (3): 1970–1971
Turkish Super Cup (2): 1971–72
Turkish Cup (2): 1972–73, 1975–76
Prime Minister's Cup (2): 1974–1975

Turkey
ECO Cup: 1969

References

External links
 
 
 *TFF Manager Profile

1948 births
2012 deaths
Footballers from Istanbul
Turkish footballers
Turkey international footballers
Turkey youth international footballers
Turkish football managers
Association football wingers
Galatasaray S.K. footballers
Kayserispor footballers
Türk Telekom G.S.K. footballers
Altay S.K. footballers
Süper Lig players
TFF First League players
Süper Lig managers